WTMR (800 AM) is a radio station broadcasting a religious format. Licensed to Camden, New Jersey, United States, it serves the Philadelphia area.  The station is currently owned by Beasley Broadcast Group, Inc., through licensee Beasley Media Group, LLC, and features programming from Westwood One.  The transmitter site is in Camden, while studios and offices are located in the "555 Building" in Bala Cynwyd, Pennsylvania.

History
The station began operations in the late 1940s as WKDN. It was originally owned by Ranulf Compton, and was a 1,000-watt, daytime-only station that broadcast middle-of-the-road music. The call letters became WTMR after the station was sold in 1968. By the early 1970s, WTMR's power had been increased to 5,000 watts. In 1975, the station began phasing out pop music in favor of religious programming. It was granted a license to operate at night during the 1980s.

External links

TMR
Radio stations established in 1948
TMR